Phrynocephalus vindumi is a species of agamid lizard found in Iran and Afghanistan.

References

vindumi
Reptiles described in 1998